Taiwan High Speed Rail (THSR) is the high-speed railway of Taiwan consisting of one line that runs approximately  along the west coast, from the capital Taipei to the southern city of Kaohsiung. With construction and operations managed by a private company, Taiwan High Speed Rail Corporation (THSRC), which also operates the line, the total cost of the project was  billion in 1998. At the time it was built, this was one of the world's largest privately funded rail construction schemes. The system is based primarily on Japan's Shinkansen.

Most intermediate stations on the line lie outside the cities served; however, a variety of transfer options, such as free shuttle buses, conventional rail, and metros have been constructed to facilitate transport connections.

Ridership initially fell short of forecasts, but grew from fewer than 40,000 passengers per day in the first few months of operation to over 129,000 passengers per day in June 2013. Daily passenger traffic reached 130,000 in 2014, well below the forecast of 240,000 daily passengers for 2008. The system carried its first 100 million passengers by August 2010 and over 200 million passengers had taken the system by December 2012, followed by 400 million by December 2016.

In the initial years of operation, THSRC accumulated debt due to high depreciation charges and interest, largely due to the financial structure set up for the private company. In 2009, THSRC negotiated with the government to change the method of depreciation from depending on concessions on rights to ridership. At the same time, the government also started to help refinance THSRC's loans to assist the company so it could remain operational and profitable. The government injected NT$30 billion as a financial bailout, boosting the government's stake to about 64% from about 37%. The government also extended the rail concession from 35 years to 70 years and terminated the company's build-operate-transfer business model.

History
Taiwan's rapid economic growth during the latter half of the twentieth century led to congestion of highways, conventional rail, and air traffic systems in the western transport corridor, which threatened to impede the region's development. The idea of a new high-speed rail line arose in the 1970s, and informal planning began in 1980. In 1987, the executive branch of Taiwan's government, the Executive Yuan, instructed the Ministry of Transportation to launch a feasibility study for a high-speed rail line in the western Taiwan corridor, which was completed in 1990. The study found that in a comparison of potential solutions to traffic problems in the corridor, a high-speed rail line would offer the highest transit volume, lowest land use, highest energy savings, and least pollution. In July 1990 the Preparation Office of High Speed Rail (POHSR) was established and a route was selected in 1991. Plans for the THSR were subsequently approved by the Executive Yuan in June 1992 and by Taiwan's legislature, the Legislative Yuan, in 1993.

Build-Operate-Transfer

In November 1994, Taiwan passed a law regarding the use of private finance in infrastructure projects, which also applied to the up-to-then state-run THSR project. Consequently, in 1995, POHSR was transformed into the Bureau of High Speed Rail (BOHSR), which started to tender THSR as a build-operate-transfer (BOT) scheme in October 1996.

The bidding process pitted Taiwan High Speed Rail Consortium (THSRC) against the Chunghwa High Speed Rail Consortium (CHSRC). THSRC's bid was based on the high-speed technology platform of Eurotrain, a joint venture between GEC-Alsthom, the main maker of the French TGV, and Siemens, the main maker of the German ICE, while CHSRC's bid was based on Japanese Shinkansen technology supplied by Taiwan Shinkansen Consortium (TSC), a joint venture of Japanese companies. THSRC, which submitted the lower bid and promised to build the line with zero net cost from the government, was chosen as the preferred bidder in September 1997. The group was renamed and formally established as the Taiwan High Speed Rail Corporation (THSRC) in May 1998. THSRC and the government signed the BOT agreement on 23 July 1998.

However, controversy arose during rolling-stock selection. In May 1999, as THSRC faced difficulties in raising capital, the government of Japan promised soft loans if THSRC switched to TSC. Although Eurotrain promised to match TSC's financial proposal, the Eschede train disaster in combination with TSC offering the newer 700 Series Shinkansen, convinced THSRC to reopen its core system bid, ultimately resulting in TSC selected as the preferred rolling-stock supplier in December 1999. Although Eurotrain eventually conceded in the bid, in February 2001 it filed for a US$800 million damage claim against THSRC at the Singapore International Arbitration Centre. After a lengthy arbitration process, the court ruled in March 2004 that THSRC should pay a compensation for the US$32.4 million Eurotrain spent on development and US$35.7 million for unjust enrichment. THSRC agreed to pay US$65 million (US$89 million with interest) to Eurotrain in November 2004.

Construction 
Construction of the line by THSRC officially started in March 1999. Tunnels and other major civil engineering works were completed by 2004, along with the first delivery of the 700T trains. Testing and commissioning of the line then took place in 2005 and 2006, with a maximum testing speed of  achieved in October 2005.

Opening

The railway was opened in 2007, with limited commercial services between Banqiao and Zuoying stations from January 5, with full service from Taipei Station to Kaohsiung from May 2007.

Three additional stations located along the line - Miaoli, Changhua and Yunlin - opened in 2015.

Southern extension 
On 10 September 2019, the Executive Yuan announced that the railway would be expanded to Pingtung. Out of four proposed route options, it was confirmed on 27 September that the expansion would bypass central Kaohsiung, branching from Zuoying east towards western Pingtung City, near , with an estimated cost of NT$55.4 billion. Although lowest in cost, the option was met with criticism regarding its economic benefits.

The extension to Pingtung was approved by Premier Su Tseng-chang in January 2023, with opening of the extension planned for 2029.

Northern extension 
The line was extended 9.2km from Taipei to Nangang, opening in July 2016. 

On 25 October 2019, the Railway Bureau published an assessment report to extend the line further from Taipei to Yilan, cutting travel time to 13 minutes. The 56.4km extension was approved in October 2020, and is planned to open by 2030.

Rolling stock

THSR 700T

Taiwan High Speed Rail started operation with 30 THSR 700T trainsets supplied by a consortium led by Kawasaki Heavy Industries. In response to increasing ridership and new stations that would begin operation in 2015, THSRC signed the contract for four new 700T trainsets with the Kawasaki consortium in May 2012 in Tokyo, Japan. The first (TR 31) trainset was delivered to Taiwan on 23 December 2012; the second (TR 32) on 21 January 2013; the third (TR33) on 25 January 2014; the fourth (TR34) on 12 August 2015.

The THSR 700T trainset is based on the 700 Series Shinkansen trainset used by JR Central and JR West in Japan. This marked the first time Shinkansen technology was exported to a foreign country. Customization was focused on adapting to Taiwan's climate and geography, and the nose shape was optimized for tunnels wider than those in Japan.

The maximum service speed of the trains was raised from the 700 Series Shinkansen's . The 12 cars of a 700T train are grouped in three traction units with three power cars and one trailer each, providing  of power; both end cars are trailers to avoid slip on powered bogies. The trains have a passenger capacity of 989 seats in two classes: 66 seats in 2+2 configuration in the single Business Car and 923 seats in 2+3 configuration in the eleven Standard Cars. The per capita energy consumption of a fully loaded 700T train is 16% of that of private cars and half that of buses; carbon dioxide emissions are 11% of private cars and a quarter that of buses.

N700S 
In the late 2010s, THSRC began work to purchase additional high speed trains, in light of growing demand. 12 trains would be ordered, at a cost of around NT$30 billion. Due to the limited number of Japanese companies who build Shinkansen rolling stock, it took several years for THSRC to agree an acceptable deal. In 2022, it was reported that THSRC was speaking to European train manufacturers instead, as the price offered by Japanese companies was "unreasonable".

In March 2023, it was announced that a joint bid by Hitachi and Toshiba had been awarded the contract. Twelve of the latest generation of Shinkansen train - the N700S Series - would be delivered at a cost of NT$28 billion.

Engineering trains 

THSRC uses overhead line inspection trains from Windhoff, Harsco railgrinders, Plasser & Theurer track tampers, and several ex-JR rolling stock to maintain its line. Among the latter include the JNR Class DD14 and JNR Class DD16 diesel-hydraulic locomotives, which were originally used for snowploughing by JR. The two ex-JR locomotives with THSRC are equipped with Shinkansen-style rotary couplers and standard-gauge bogies instead of the original  gauge bogies and knuckle couplers and are used for shunting the 700T trainsets within the depot. THSRC also uses a former 0 Series Shinkansen end car as a structure gauge test car.

Operation 
As the first high speed railway system in Taiwan, THSRC started operation in 2007 with many foreign employees, including French and German train drivers and operation controllers in the Operation Control Center (OCC). At the same time, THSRC also started to train local drivers and controllers. Since May 2008, all controllers working in the OCC have been Taiwanese, and since October 2008, all train drivers have been Taiwanese.

The OCC's main responsibility is to maintain safe train operations. THSRC has 132 controllers (July 2012), of which about one quarter are female, working 24 hours per day and 365 days per year in the OCC. Requirements for becoming a Chief Controller (主任控制員) include experience in all nine OCC positions, 300-hours of on-the-job training and acquiring qualification.

THSRC has 144 drivers (July 2012), of which almost 10% are female. All driver candidates must spend 8 months completing 1,326 hours of professional training and pass the National Certification before they can drive the train. In addition, after becoming a certified high-speed train driver, they undergo further on-the-job training at least three times each year in order to guarantee they can drive the train safely.

Natural disasters
Taiwan frequently faces multiple types of natural disasters, including typhoons, earthquakes, heavy rainfall, floods, and landslides. For this reason, a primary focus of THSRC's infrastructure design was how to respond to natural disasters such as earthquakes and how to ensure safety for all passengers and trains in any emergency situation.

THSRC has established a system to respond to natural disasters and unexpected intrusion onto the right-of-way, called DWS (Disaster Warning Systems). This system consists of a network of sensors installed along the rail route to detect unexpected situations such as earthquakes, strong winds, heavy rainfall, floods, landslides, and intrusions. In case of an unexpected situation, the DWS will send signals to the OCC (Operation Control Center) immediately; it will also activate contingency measures to ensure the safety of the passengers and trains, including decelerating or stopping trains in the affected area.

The DWS has functioned successfully since its initial operation in 2007. The most powerful earthquake that THSRC has experienced measured 6.4 on the Richter Scale with an epicenter  from Jiaxian, Kaohsiung that shook southern Taiwan on 4 March 2010 (甲仙地震). One operating train was slightly derailed in Sinshih, Tainan, and six trains were stopped on the track. In spite of the temporary suspension of operations, there was no damage or casualties. All 2,500 affected passengers were evacuated in two hours without injury. Service resumed the next day. Such a record was well noted, and provided valuable experience in operational safety to the global railway industry.

In April 2010, it was reported that subsidence had been observed during construction on a  viaduct section in Yunlin County. By 2010 subsidence had slowed, which was ascribed to the closure of some deep groundwater wells operating in the region. Although the situation was deemed safe with differential settlement between adjacent piers along the viaduct at only a sixth of the permissible level, the BOHSR urged the closure of more wells.

Service

According to THSR's July 2018 timetable, there are 989 train services per week of operation, with operation times between 05:50 to 24:00 every day. Most southbound trains originate from Nangang station and most northbound trains originate from Zuoying; however, a few trains operate just between Nangang and Taichung or between Taichung and Zuoying. Southbound trains are designated by odd train numbers, and northbound trains by even train numbers.

Each train consists of 1 business car (car 6) and 11 standard cars (including reserved seats and non-reserved seats). Since July 2010, non-reserved seats are available in cars 10 through 12 (some trains available in cars 9 through 12 or available in cars 8 through 12 ). Car 7 of each train is fitted with 4 wheelchair accessible chairs and a disabled-friendly restroom. Passengers can call THSR's Customer Service Hot Line at (Taiwan) 4066-3000 or visit any THSR station ticket window to reserve these seats.

By August 2012, implementation of 4G WiMAX on-board trains is expected to provide smooth wireless broadband services, making THSR the first high-speed ground transportation system equipped with this service.

In 2012, THSRC rated highly in the CommonWealth Magazine (天下雜誌) "Golden Service Award survey" (金牌服務大賞), not only far outpacing all rivals in the "long-distance land transport" category, but also taking the top spot in the overall rankings of 300 industries.

Local connections
To improve local public transit connections to THSR stations, the TRA built two new spur lines branching off from West Coast Line.
Shalun Line for Tainan opened on 2 January 2011,
Liujia Line for Hsinchu opened on 11 November 2011.

Stop Patterns
With a few exceptions, the services follow the below pattern.

Ticket fare and discount

As of January 2018, a one-way Taipei–Zuoying trip, a THSR standard car adult ticket is NT$1490, and a business car ticket fare is NT$1950. The cost of a non-reserved seat is approximately 3% less than the regular price. Business and standard car reserved ticket reservations are available 28 days prior to the date of departure (including the departure day).

Senior citizens (Taiwan citizens above 65 years of age), registered disabled persons plus one accompanying passenger (Taiwan citizens only), and children (passengers under 12 years of age) are eligible for concession (half price) tickets.

A group discount is offered for groups of 11 or more. A group discount cannot be used in combination with other discount offers and does not include non-reserved seats. Passengers eligible for multiple discounts can only choose one discount offer.

Since 1 July 2010, a smart card system has provided frequent travelers with multi-ride (eight trips) or periodic tickets. THSR's contact-less smart cards allow the cardholder to travel between specific stations within a given time period for a certain number of rides. The card is sold in either registered (name-bearing) or non-registered form. Only adult tickets are available in this format, and cannot be used for rides between Banqiao and Taipei.

After purchasing or adding value to a multi-ride card, the card balance is valid for 45 days counted from the day of first use. The ticket is good for 8 rides. The multi-ride card provides a discount of about 21% off the full fare of a reserved Standard Seat. Non-registered and registered multi-ride tickets can be purchased at the ticket windows of all THSRC stations. Upon first purchase of a multi-ride ticket, a card deposit fee of NT$100 is required (refundable if the card is returned). The registered multi-ride ticket is limited to personal use by the registered cardholder.
Since November 2012, an Early Bird discount of 35% has been offered for a limited number of tickets sold no later than 8 days before the departure date. If the 35% off tickets sell out before the deadline, tickets with a discount of 20% off are offered. If these tickets sell out before the deadline, tickets with a discount of 10% off are offered. If all early bird tickets are sold out, then full fare tickets are offered.

Train frequency

THSRC operates additional train services during national holidays. On 29 June 2011, a proposal by THSRC to increase the maximum number of train services to 210 per day (compared to the existing 175 per day) passed an environmental impact assessment, increasing the number of possible services on "high-load days".

Ridership

Original estimates predicted a daily ridership of 180,000 after launch, growing to 400,000 by 2036. In view of a 50% drop in airline passengers in the wake of the 1997 Asian financial crisis, forecasts were revised downwards. The final initial ridership estimate was 140,000 passengers per day. Actual initial ridership did not match these projections. In September 2007, six months after opening, THSRC carried 1.5 million passengers monthly, translating to about 50,000 passengers daily. In the second year, passenger numbers almost doubled. In the third year, average daily ridership continued to grow to 88,000 passengers per day, jumping to over 120,000 passengers per day in 2012. (updated to September 2012) Seat occupancy was around 45% in the first three years, with a modest improvement achieved in 2009, and reached 53.91% in 2012. (updated to September 2012) Punctuality is stable above 99%.

The 10-millionth passenger was carried after 265 days of operation on 26 September 2007, while the 100-millionth passenger was carried after 1,307 days on 3 August 2010, and 200-millionth by December 2012. On 10 October 2011, the Double Ten Day holiday, THSRC transported a single-day record of 189,386 passengers. On 5 February 2011, the third day of Chinese New Year’s celebration, a new record of 190,596 passengers was achieved. The next single-day record was reached on 25 January 2012, also the third day of Chinese New Year's celebration, at 191,989 passengers. The most recent record is 212,000 passengers transported on 1 January 2013.

The high-speed trains have successfully out-competed planes: by August 2008, half of the air routes between Taipei and the country's western cities had been discontinued, including all connections between cities with THSR stations except for a single daily connection between Taipei and Kaohsiung. Total domestic air traffic was expected to be halved from 2006 to 2008, and actually fell from 8.6 to 4.9 million. In June 2012, officials announced the discontinuation of the last remaining commercial flight between Taipei and Kaohsiung. The share for conventional rail between Taipei and Kaohsiung fell from 9.71% in 2006 to 2.5% in 2008, while high-speed rail became the most common mode of transport at 50% of all trips by 2008. The opening of THSR led to a 10% reduction of traffic on the parallel expressway in 2007. Despite cheaper ticket prices, long-distance bus companies reported that passenger volumes had fallen by 20 to 30 percent by 2008.

Infrastructure

Construction of the system took more than 2,000 professional engineers from 20 countries and over 20,000 foreign and domestic workers six years to complete. Construction work was broken into several specialized lots that were contracted separately. One group of contracts was for civil works, covering the construction of the superstructure of open line sections. Stations and depots were the subject of separate groups of construction contracts. A fourth group of contracts was for track work.

The Taiwan North-South High Speed Rail Project was awarded the first prize for the Outstanding Civil Engineering Project Award by the Asian Civil Engineering Coordination Council (ACECC) in Sydney in 2010.

In 2011, the Public Construction Commission (公共工程委員會) organized an on-line voting campaign that garnered over 330,000 votes, to select the 100 best infrastructure projects (百大建設) in Taiwan to celebrate the centennial of the Republic; Taiwan High Speed Rail topped the list.

Track

All but  of track is ballastless, combining slab track of Japanese manufacture on open line sections with switches from a German supplier. Track laying began in July 2003. The line was electrified with the 25 kV/60 Hz AC system. The signalling and train control system was laid out for bi-directional operation according to European specifications.

Most of the line is elevated. About  or 73% of the line runs on viaducts, mostly precast pre-stressed concrete box girder spans, the first of which was put in place in October 2001.

The Changhua-Kaohsiung Viaduct is a  continuous section from Baguashan (八卦山) in Changhua County to Zuoying in Kaohsiung. It was the second longest bridge in the world as of 2017. Viaducts were designed to be earthquake resistant to allow for trains to stop safely during a seismic event and for repairable damage following a maximum design earthquake. Bridges built over known fault lines were designed to survive fault movements without catastrophic damage.

After four months of delays, trial runs using the first THSR 700T trains began on 27 January 2005, on the Tainan–Kaohsiung section. The section between Banqiao (Taipei) and Zuoying (Kaohsiung) opened to the public on 5 January 2007. The HSR platforms at Taipei Station opened on 2 March 2007, bringing the entire line into operation.

Stations
A distinctive feature of the system's station placement is that many are located at the periphery of urban areas, rather than within city centers. The decision was made with the expectation that the stations would act as centers for planned communities and thus increase the property values of the surrounding area. A study in 2010 showed that this isn't the case, but later analyses show that property prices around certain stations have indeed risen. Since the THSR's opening, cities have gradually expanded their mass transit systems to connect with these stations.

Environmental issues

 Environmental mitigation measures in the line's construction phase included the construction of animal bridges over the line, the planting and re-planting of trees along the track as noise screens, and the purchase of farmland to create a preservation area for jacana birds away from the line.

THSRC is involved in the preservation of the pheasant-tailed jacana, which is considered endangered in Taiwan. An artificial habitat recovery project was completed in collaboration with the local government, country development organizations and non-profit organizations for a cost of NT$50 million. In 2007, the recovery habitat was officially renamed the "Pheasant-tailed Jacana Eco-Educational Nature Park" and since then, it has opened to the public. THSRC arranges for elementary and junior high school students to visit the park annually.

 A 330 year old camphor tree and a temple in Hsinchu County are located on the main route of the THSR, and both of them faced removal because of railway construction. The temple established beside the old tree serves as a major religious site for the local community. In 1998, THSRC adjusted the line and design to keep the tree and temple in their original place and cooperated with the local government and people to protect the old tree and the temple until today. Afterwards, together with the local government, the Environment and the Resources Protection Committee, and cultural and historical authorities, THSRC drafted the Hsinchu Old Camphor Tree Medical Plan, which called for the repair of decayed branches as well as measures designed to maintain the long-term growth and the health of the tree.

Financial

Revenue and cost

Most of THSRC's revenue comes from ticket sales; supplemental income comes from other activities such as advertising and renting spaces for standing shops and spots in plazas. Advertising spots on trains and station platforms have also been sold.
Revenues grew along with ridership over the first three years, but ridership remained below expectations. In 2008 the second year of operation, revenues fell barely short of THSRC's expectations a year earlier of a doubling of first-year results.

The cost of running the trains and infrastructure, or cash operating costs, was initially over NT$1 billion a month, but was reduced to around NT$850–900 million in 2008. Revenues first exceeded this level, thus generating a positive operating cash flow, in the fourth month of operation (April 2007).

For THSRC, the over heavy accounting of the fixed cost of fixed assets like rolling stock and infrastructure (depreciation) is a significant non-cash element of total operating costs. In its first two years of operation, THSRC applied straight-line depreciation, distributing costs evenly over a period of 26.5 years. As a result, the balance of operating revenues and costs (operating income) showed a high loss in the first year of operation, which was only reduced as revenues grew in the second year. The depreciation period set for THSRC reflected the length of the B.O.T. concession rather than the much longer lifespan of the infrastructure, and it is the factor for the operating loss. After adopting an activity depreciation method which is variable in time, THSRC posted its first operating profit for 2009, the third year of operation. The company reported its first annual profit of NT$5.78 billion after five years of operation.

For the first time in its five-year operation, the Company reported a net income of NT$5.78 billion, with earnings per share of NT$0.59. Revenues increased by 16.65% from NT$27.64 billion to NT$32.24 billion, with operating costs and expenses (excluding depreciation and amortization) rising by only 4.98%. Over the same period of time, gross profit totaled NT$12.98 billion (an increase of 30.32%), income from operations totaled NT$12.06 billion (an increase of 32.93%) and EBITDA totaled NT$22.73 billion (an increase of 22.34%). 2011 gross profit, income from operation and EBITDA were all record highs. Since commencing operations in 2007, THSRC has had a significant influence on Taiwan's economy and on the lives of its people. In 2011, the Company continued to pursue sustainable growth aligned with the interests of shareholders and society, achieving record profits even amid a challenging economic environment.

The interest cost is another major item of this company's financing. In the first few years of operation, interest rates were well above market rates. Interest expense per month stood at around NT$1.3 billion in 2008, when THSRC first achieved break-even cash flow, with revenue and cash expenses (which exclude depreciation) both around NT$2.1 billion in 2008. Interest rates fell in the first half of 2009, reducing interest expenses and contributing to a reduced net loss.

In 2010, THSRC obtained a new syndicate loan to alleviate its imminent financial burden. The company signed a NT$382 billion refinancing contract with a consortium of eight domestic banks led by the Bank of Taiwan, and used the new loan to pay off the previous syndicated loan, which had higher interest. , the long-term debts totalling NT$385 billion included NT$26 billion in corporate bonds and NT$359 billion in bank loans. In comparison with the terms and conditions of previous loans, the refinancing debts carried lower interest rates and longer tenors, up to 22 years.

Financial and loan
In cumulative figures, until July 2008, depreciation and interest were equal to 95% of THSRC's accumulated debt. Both THSRC and a September 2009 government report identified an unreasonable financial structure and the resulting high interest rates and high depreciation charges as the main causes of negative financial performance, while the government assessed THSRC to have performed well in its core business, as measured by earnings before interest, taxes, depreciation and amortization (EBITDA). To reduce its interest load, THSRC sought to revise its loan structure in 2008 and again in 2009. To reduce depreciation costs by increasing the amortization time, THSRC requested an extension of its 35-year concession period.

By the summer of 2009, THSRC's cumulative losses were equivalent to two-thirds of its equity capital. In response to global financial crisis and domestic economic recession, THSRC proposed to increase income and reduce expenditures in several aspects in the hope of raising operation performances. In February 2009, THSRC announced to adjust train frequency, cut down salary payment by 10~20% among management level, and measured to expand fare promotion to stimulate ridership.
While the media questioned whether the planned construction of three more intermediate stations and the extension to Nangang would be postponed, THSRC published press release on 28 September 2009, stating that the company will comply with "Taiwan High Speed. Rail Construction and Operation Contract", and the construction project of 3 intermediate stations, namely Miaoli, Changhua and Yunlin will be initiated in July 2012, and is scheduled to start its operation from 2015. By the time of completion, there will be a total of 12 stations along the THSRC operation route. The company was put under new management in September 2009 with the aim of turning around the company's finances with government help in arranging refinancing of the loans.

The government took majority control of the company after the election of its new board on 10 November 2009. In January 2010, when accumulated losses already exceeded NT$70 billion, THSRC signed a government-guaranteed refinancing deal in which eight government-dominated banks provided NT$382 billion at lower interest rates and longer maturity. The government also approved the company's new variable depreciation charge.

Incidents
On 12 April 2013, suspicious luggage items were found inside the North bound train No. 616 toilet when it was heading towards THSR Hsinchu Station. The train was stopped at THSR Taoyuan Station and all of the passengers were evacuated. Later, it was determined the luggage contained an unidentified liquid in cans, alarm clock and white particulate matter. The items were dismantled by the bomb squad and taken for further investigation. Two KMT legislators, Hsu Hsin-ying and Lu Shiow-yen, were on board.

On 12 April 2013, the train master on no. 616 received complaints from passengers at about 9:10am that the women's toilet in cabin No. 11 contained two pieces of luggage which emitted a strange odor. THSRC informed the High Speed Rail Police Division, which later boarded the train when it stopped at Hsinchu station. The traffic control center decided to evacuate passengers after the train stopped at Taoyuan station at 9:45am. More than 600 people were asked to disembark and continue their journey on another train. Two suspects were arrested in a hotel in Zhongshan, Guangdong Province, mainland China on 15 April and repatriated to Taiwan on 17 April 2013.

Part of the tracks near Tainan were badly damaged during the earthquake on 6 February 2016. All high-speed rail services south of Chiayi Station were suspended until 7 February 2016.

On 10 May 2017, a non-passenger carrying train traveled in the opposite direction of the track from Zuoying to Tainan for  due to human negligence.

Due to the COVID-19 pandemic, the THSR, along with Taiwan Railway Administration and bus services nationwide, began to require all passengers to wear surgical masks as of 1 April. In addition, infrared sensors were set up at twelve stations to detect fevers, eating and drinking were prohibited on board the trains, trains and stations were disinfected more frequently, and the THSR cancelled all non-reserved seating tickets, which allowed for crowds of passengers to stand if no seats were available. It was reported that the switch to reserved seats only aimed to reduce crowding.

Public relations activities

THSRC conducts community engagement activities to raise its profile.

Since 2009, the company has organized an annual "Ride THSR and Join the Book Exhibition for Free" event to promote a national reading culture; school-age passengers from remote villages are given free admission to the Taipei International Book Exhibition and go there on a themed high-speed "reading train", which features a celebrity reading a book over the train's public address system.

Since 2010, along with World Vision Taiwan, THSRC has run a tuition fee assistance program for thousands of underprivileged children, to which passengers contribute.

Other events have been a capella singers at stations; gift-giving to couples taking wedding photos at major stations; station tours for the public and experience-sharing with its fellow railway transportation operators; and in collaboration with non-profit organizations, thousands of free rides to underprivileged groups and families.

Students at primary, secondary and tertiary level  learn about high-speed rail and THSRC at "THSR Camps", held in partnership with the Railway Cultural Society of Taiwan, the National Chiao Tung University Railway Research Society, and the China Youth Corps.

In popular culture
The first film to feature THSR prominently was the 2007 Taiwanese movie Summer's Tail, directed by Cheng Wen-tang.

Railfan: Taiwan High Speed Rail, a 2007 train simulator video game developed jointly by Taiwanese company Actainment and Japanese company Ongakukan on the basis of the latter's Train Simulator series, featured real video and was the first Taiwanese game for Sony Computer Entertainment's PlayStation 3 system.
The "National Geographic" website chose travel by Taiwan's high speed train as the "Best winter trip” in 2013.

See also
Rail transport in Taiwan
Transportation in Taiwan

Notes

References

Further reading

External links

 
Bureau of High Speed Rail, Ministry of Transportation and Communications 

 
Rail transport in Taiwan
Build–operate–transfer
High-speed rail in Taiwan
High-speed trains
Railway lines opened in 2007
2007 establishments in Taiwan
25 kV AC railway electrification
Companies based in Taipei